This is a list of mayors of Chattanooga, Tennessee. Tim Kelly has been the incumbent mayor of Chattanooga since his inauguration on April 19, 2021 at the Tivoli Theatre (Chattanooga, Tennessee).

Notes[a] From 1840-1882, all mayors served one year terms, with several mayors elected to successive terms.
[b] From 1883-1911, all mayors served two year terms, with several mayors elected to successive terms.
[c] From 1911 to the present, most mayors have served four year terms, with several mayors elected to successive terms.

See also
 Timeline of Chattanooga, Tennessee

Notes

Further reading
"Mayor's Office: History of Mayors" — City of Chattanooga

Chattanooga
 
1840 establishments in Tennessee